Barry Cooper (born May 21, 1969) is an American drug reform activist and filmmaker. Formerly a police officer in Texas, Cooper is best known for KopBusters, a series of online videos in which he attempts to document police misconduct, and Never Get Busted Again, a series of videos aimed at teaching drug users how to evade arrest by the police.

Early life and career

Born , Cooper was raised in California until 1979, when his family moved to Texas.

Cooper began his law enforcement career with the Gladewater Police Department as a police dispatcher. He was later hired by the Big Sandy Police Department as an interdiction officer in East Texas and trained his own narcotic detection dog. While working in law enforcement, he confiscated large amounts of narcotics and money. Cooper's former superior officer, Tom Finley, described Cooper as "probably the best narcotics officer in the state and maybe the country during his time with the task force." Cooper reports noticing that people arrested for possession of marijuana were nonviolent and cooperative, in contrast to people intoxicated on alcohol who "... would fight and scream and act crazy." He also noted being deeply affected by the emotional trauma he witnessed while participating in home narcotics raids with other officers attired in raid gear and "more guns than we would ever need." Cooper also stated, "We're sending the kids to the department of human services, we're sending the parents to jail over marijuana. Well, I knew some of these people and I knew they weren't gangsters. I knew they were nonviolent people." He left law enforcement soon after.

Activism
Cooper struck on the idea using an internet-distributed reality TV format program called "KopBusters" that would muckrake abuses of drug enforcement organizations. In a typical KopBusters sting operation, Cooper and his associates would place fake drug evidence and cash and call the police to report the "suspicious" materials. Then they would video record the police activity to see if the officers took the cash and destroyed the other evidence, the latter being a felony offense, according to his lawyer. Cooper set up a sting with no real evidence to trick Odessa, Texas police into raiding a fake marijuana hothouse and published the video of the event publicly via KopBusters. This last sting operation also helped to free Yolanda Madden, a mother of two sentenced to 8 years in prison for drug possession, which she alleged was planted by a police informant.

These activities quickly drew the ire of Williamson County police, who raided his home on March 3, 2010, and charged him with two counts of misdemeanor making a false report to a police officer. Other consequences included several arrests, Child Protective Services investigations of Cooper's custody of his son, and a visit by the Texas Rangers, over the Odessa charge, which was later dropped. Due to concerns about further harassment and threats, Cooper fled the U.S. with his family to Brazil in 2013. Cooper remains active in the anti-drug war movement via his website, which provides advice, video materials, and expert witness services to recreational drug users.

Political career
Cooper ran as a Libertarian in the 2010 Texas Attorney General Race on a "pro-pot, pro-gun, pro-family platform." He later dropped out of the race after being repeatedly arrested. He had previously run as a Libertarian candidate for U.S. House of Representatives in Texas in 2008. He garnered 3% of the vote in that race.

See also
 Arguments for and against drug prohibition

References

External links
 

1969 births
Living people
Activists from Texas
American drug policy reform activists
American humanitarians
American law enforcement officials
American motivational speakers
American political activists
Texas Libertarians
People from Big Sandy, Texas
People from Gladewater, Texas